William F. Collins may refer to:

William Floyd Collins (1887–1925), pioneer cave explorer  
William F. Collins, World War II air ace